Breaking New Ground may refer to:
Breaking New Ground (Mal Waldron album)
Breaking New Ground (Wild Rose album)
 "Breaking New Ground" (song), its title track